Ashland Transportation Center is an intermodal transit station in Ashland, Kentucky. Jointly operated by the City of Ashland and CSX Transportation, it currently serves Amtrak's Cardinal train as well as the Ashland Bus System and Greyhound Lines buses. It is located at 99 15th Street near downtown Ashland.

History

Chesapeake & Ohio era 
The station is located in a former Chesapeake and Ohio Railway freight house originally built in the 1890s. Railway services formerly operated out of the Chesapeake and Ohio passenger station nearby (currently a PNC Bank branch). In the early 1960s the following named trains served the station daily: Fast Flying Virginian (west to Cincinnati, and sections east to Washington, D.C. and Newport News), George Washington (sections west to Cincinnati and Louisville, and sections east to Washington, D.C. and Newport News) and the Sportsman (northwest to Detroit, and sections east to Washington, D.C. and Newport News). Prior to the 1971 shift of long distance passenger train services from private companies to Amtrak, the C&O's George Washington had a main section going north to Columbus, Ohio and Detroit, Michigan, a section running west from Ashland to Louisville, and east-bound sections going to Washington, D.C. and Newport News.

Amtrak era 
In 1975, Amtrak abandoned the original station (which served the daily James Whitcomb Riley train) in favor of nearby Tri-State Station in Catlettsburg. The city purchased the former freight house in 1997 using more than $500,000 in federal funds obtained through the Intermodal Surface Transportation Enhancement Act of 1991 in order to restore it as an intermodal transit station serving rail as well as buses. Amtrak moved rail services to the restored facility on March 11, 1998.

The station is jointly owned by the City of Ashland and CSX Transportation and is operated in co-operation with the city, Amtrak, Greyhound Lines and the Ashland Bus System. The station has an enclosed waiting area with restrooms and water fountains, but no Amtrak station services area available. There is a Greyhound ticket agent available at specified times. The station serves Amtrak's Cardinal, trains 50 and 51. The tracks at the station are currently owned by CSX Transportation.

References

External links 

Ashland, Kentucky Amtrak Station (USA Rail Guide -- Train Web)

Amtrak stations in Kentucky
Ashland, Kentucky
Buildings and structures in Boyd County, Kentucky
Transportation in Boyd County, Kentucky
Stations along Chesapeake and Ohio Railway lines
Railway stations in the United States opened in 1998
1998 establishments in Kentucky